The Grand Hogback is a 70-mile long, curving, spine-like ridge in Western Colorado that extends from near McClure Pass in Pitkin County through Garfield County and then to near Meeker in Rio Blanco County. The hogback is significant because it marks part of the boundary between the Colorado Plateau to the west and the Southern Rocky Mountains to the east.

The hogback appears as a series of serrated ridges and is easily discernable from Google Maps and other aerial views. It is visible from Interstate 70.

Gaps
Rivers have carved out several gaps in the hogback, the most notable being the one the Colorado River has carved out near New Castle, Colorado. Others include Harvey Gap and Rifle Gap, both of which have been dammed to create reservoirs and state parks.

Geology
A monocline, the Grand Hogback is part of the Mesaverde Formation. The ridge formed towards the end of the Laramide orogeny during the middle to late Eocene.

References

External links
 The Geology of the Grand Hogback Monocline near Meeker, Colorado – Colorado Geological Survey. 

Ridges of Colorado
Geology of the Rocky Mountains
Landforms of Garfield County, Colorado
Landforms of Rio Blanco County, Colorado
Landforms of Pitkin County, Colorado